A circumbinary planet is a planet that orbits two stars instead of one. The two stars orbit each other in a binary system, while the planet typically orbits farther from the center of the system than either of the two stars. In contrast, circumstellar planets in a binary system have stable orbits around one of the two stars, closer in than the orbital distance of the other star. Studies in 2013 showed that there is a strong hint that a circumbinary planet and its stars originate from a single disk.

Observations and discoveries

Confirmed planets

PSR B1620-26 
The first confirmed circumbinary planet was found orbiting the system PSR B1620-26, which contains a millisecond pulsar and a white dwarf and is located in the globular cluster M4. The existence of the third body was first reported in 1993, and was suggested to be a planet based on 5 years of observational data. In 2003 the planet was characterised as being 2.5 times the mass of Jupiter in a low eccentricity orbit with a semimajor axis of 23 AU.

HD 202206 
The first circumbinary planet around a main sequence star was found in 2005 in the system HD 202206: a Jupiter-size planet orbiting a system composed of a Sun-like star and a brown dwarf.

HW Virginis 
Announced in 2008, the eclipsing binary system HW Virginis, comprising a subdwarf B star and a red dwarf, was claimed to also host a planetary system. The claimed planets have masses at least 8.47 and 19.23 times that of Jupiter respectively, and were proposed to have orbital periods of 9 and 16 years. The proposed outer planet is sufficiently massive that it may be considered to be a brown dwarf under some definitions of the term, but the discoverers claimed that the orbital configuration implies it would have formed like a planet from a circumbinary disc. Both planets may have accreted additional mass when the primary star lost material during its red giant phase.

Further work on the system showed that the orbits proposed for the candidate planets were catastrophically unstable on timescales far shorter than the age of the system. Indeed, the authors found that the system was so unstable that it simply cannot exist, with mean lifetimes of less than a thousand years across the whole range of plausible orbital solutions. Like other planetary systems proposed around similar evolved binary star systems, it seems likely that some mechanism other than claimed planets is responsible for the observed behaviour of the binary stars – and that the claimed planets simply do not exist.

Kepler-16 
On 15 September 2011, astronomers, using data from NASA's Kepler space telescope, announced the first partial-eclipse-based discovery of a circumbinary planet. The planet, called Kepler-16b, is about 200 light years from Earth, in the constellation Cygnus, and is believed to be a frozen world of rock and gas, about the mass of Saturn. It orbits two stars that are also circling each other, one about two-thirds the size of the Sun, the other about a fifth the size of the Sun. Each orbit of the stars by the planet takes 229 days, while the planet orbits the system's center of mass every 225 days; the stars eclipse each other every three weeks or so.

PH1 (Kepler-64) 
In 2012 volunteers of the Planet Hunters project discovered PH1b (Planet Hunters 1 b), a circumbinary planet in a quadruple star system.

Kepler-453 
In 2015, astronomers confirmed the existence of Kepler-453b, a circumbinary planet with orbital period of 240.5 days.

Kepler-1647 
A new planet, called Kepler-1647b, was announced on June 13, 2016. It was discovered using the Kepler telescope. The planet is a gas giant, similar in size to Jupiter which makes it the second largest circumbinary planet ever discovered, next to PSR B1620-26. It is located in the stars' habitable zone, and it orbits the star system in 1107 days, which makes it the longest period of any confirmed transiting exoplanet so far.

MXB 1658-298 
A massive planet around this Low Mass X-ray Binary (LMXB) system was found by the method of periodic delay in X-ray eclipses.

TOI 1338 b 

A large planet called TOI 1338 b, around 6.9 times as large as Earth and 1,300 light years away, was announced on January 6, 2020.

Other observations 

Claims of a planet discovered via microlensing, orbiting the close binary pair MACHO-1997-BLG-41, were announced in 1999.  The planet was said to be in a wide orbit around the two red dwarf companions, but the claims were later retracted, as it turned out the detection could be better explained by the orbital motion of the binary stars themselves.

Several attempts have been made to detect planets around the eclipsing binary system CM Draconis, itself part of the triple system GJ 630.1. The eclipsing binary has been surveyed for transiting planets, but no conclusive detections were made and eventually the existence of all the candidate planets was ruled out. More recently, efforts have been made to detect variations in the timing of the eclipses of the stars caused by the reflex motion associated with an orbiting planet, but at present no discovery has been confirmed. The orbit of the binary stars is eccentric, which is unexpected for such a close binary as tidal forces ought to have circularised the orbit. This may indicate the presence of a massive planet or brown dwarf in orbit around the pair whose gravitational effects maintain the eccentricity of the binary.

Circumbinary discs that may indicate processes of planet formation have been found around several stars, and are in fact common around binaries with separations less than 3 AU. One notable example is in the HD 98800 system, which comprises two pairs of binary stars separated by around 34 AU. The binary subsystem HD 98800 B, which consists of two stars of 0.70 and 0.58 solar masses in a highly eccentric orbit with semimajor axis 0.983 AU, is surrounded by a complex dust disc that is being warped by the gravitational effects of the mutually-inclined and eccentric stellar orbits. The other binary subsystem, HD 98800 A, is not associated with significant amounts of dust.

System characteristics
The Kepler results indicate circumbinary planetary systems are relatively common (as of October 2013 the spacecraft had found seven planets out of roughly 1000 eclipsing binaries searched).

Stellar configuration
There is a wide range of stellar configurations for which circumbinary planets can exist. Primary star masses range from 0.69 to 1.53 solar masses (Kepler-16 A & PH1 Aa), star mass ratios from 1.03 to 3.76 (Kepler-34 & PH1), and binary eccentricity from 0.023 to 0.521 (Kepler-47 & Kepler-34). The distribution of planet eccentricities, range from nearly circular e=0.007 to a significant e=0.182 (Kepler-16 & Kepler-34). No orbital resonances with the binary have been found.

Orbital dynamics
The binary stars Kepler-34 A and B have a highly eccentric orbit (e = 0.521) around each other and
their interaction with the planet is strong enough that a deviation from Kepler's laws is noticeable after just one orbit.

Co-planarity
All Kepler circumbinary planets that were known as of August 2013 orbit their stars very close to the plane of the binary (in a prograde direction) which suggests a single-disk formation. However, not all circumbinary planets are co-planar with the binary: Kepler-413b is tilted 2.5 degrees which may be due to the gravitational influence of other planets or a third star. Taking into account the selection biases, the average mutual inclination between the planetary orbits and the stellar binaries is within ~3 degrees, consistent with the mutual inclinations of planets in multi-planetary systems.

Axial tilt precession
The axial tilt of Kepler-413b's spin axis might vary by as much as 30 degrees over 11 years, leading to rapid and erratic changes in seasons.

Migration
Simulations show that it is likely that all of the circumbinary planets known prior to a 2014 study migrated significantly from their formation location with the possible exception of Kepler-47 (AB)c.

Semi-major axes close to critical radius
The minimum stable star to circumbinary planet separation is about 2–4 times the binary star separation, or orbital period about 3–8 times the binary period. The innermost planets in all the Kepler circumbinary systems have been found orbiting close to this radius. The planets have semi-major axes that lie between 1.09 and 1.46 times this critical radius. The reason could be that migration might become inefficient near the critical radius, leaving planets just outside this radius.

Recently, it has been found that the distribution of the innermost planetary semi-major axes is consistent with a log-uniform distribution, taking into account the selection biases, where closer-in planets can be detected more easily. This questions the pile-up of planets near the stability limit as well as the dominance of planet migration.

Absence of planets around shorter period binaries

Most Kepler eclipsing binaries have periods less than 1 day but the shortest period of a Kepler eclipsing binary hosting a planet is 7.4 days (Kepler-47). The short-period binaries are unlikely to have formed in such a tight orbit and their lack of planets may be related to the mechanism that removed angular momentum allowing the stars to orbit so closely. One exception is the planet around an X-ray binary MXB_1658-298, which has an orbital period of 7.1 hours.

Planet size limit
As of June 2016, all but one of the confirmed Kepler circumbinary planets are smaller than Jupiter. This cannot be a selection effect because larger planets are easier to detect. Simulations had predicted this would be the case.

Habitability

All the Kepler circumbinary planets are either close to or actually in the habitable zone. None of them are terrestrial planets, but large moons of such planets could be habitable. Because of the stellar binarity, the insolation received by the planet will likely be time-varying in a way quite unlike the regular sunlight Earth receives.

Transit probability

Circumbinary planets are generally more likely to transit than planets around a single star. The probability when the planetary orbit overlaps with the stellar binary orbit has been obtained. For planets orbiting eclipsing stellar binaries (such as the detected systems), the analytical expression of the transit probability in a finite observation time has been obtained.

List of circumbinary planets

Confirmed circumbinary planets 

 Planet was discovered in 2014, but the binarity of the host star was discovered in 2016.

Unconfirmed or doubtful 

†  Orbital period measurement in years (hand calculated Fermi estimate will show this).

A pair of planets around HD 202206 or a circumbinary planet?

HD 202206 is a Sun-like star orbited by two objects, one of 17 MJ and one of 2.4 MJ. The classification of HD 202206 b as a brown dwarf or "superplanet" is now clear. HD 202206 b is actually a red dwarf with 0.089 solar masses. The two objects could have both formed in a protoplanetary disk with the inner one becoming a superplanet, or the outer planet could have formed in a circumbinary disk.
A dynamical analysis of the system further shows a 5:1 mean motion resonance between the planet and the brown dwarf.
These observations raise the question of how this system was formed, but numerical simulations show that a planet formed in a circumbinary disk can migrate inward until it is captured in resonance.

Fiction 
Circumbinary planets are common in many science fiction stories:
 In David Lindsay's A Voyage to Arcturus, Lindsay imagines that Arcturus is a binary system made up of the stars Branchspell and Alppain, and orbited by the planet Tormance.
 In the Trigun series, the planet orbits a binary star system.
 In the Star Wars series, the planet Tatooine orbits in a close binary system.
 In the series Doctor Who, a binary system with such a planet is featured in The Chase. "Gridlock" also depicts the planet Gallifrey as in a binary system, but possibly in a non-circumbinary orbit.
 In the Star Fox series, the planets orbit Lylat and Solar (an M-class red dwarf)
 In the Hitchhiker's Guide to the Galaxy series, the circumbinary planet Magrathea is described as the "most improbable planet that ever existed".

See also 
List of planet types
Circumtriple planet

References

Further reading 
 

Types of planet